Ceremony for the 16th Hong Kong Film Awards was held on 13 April 1997 in the Hong Kong Cultural Centre and hosted by Lydia Shum and Nancy Sit. In total, sixteen winners in fifteen categories were unveiled. Peter Chan's Comrades: Almost a Love Story became the biggest winner for the year with nine awards, setting the record for the highest number of categories won by a single film. The event also marked the last time the Hong Kong Film Awards was held while under British colonial rule.

The nominees were announced on 24 February 1997. The front runners were Peter Chan's Comrades: Almost a Love Story and Benny Chan's Big Bullet, with eleven and nine nominations respectively.

Awards
Winners are listed first, highlighted in boldface, and indicated with a double dagger.

References

External links
 Official website of the Hong Kong Film Awards

1997
1996 film awards
1997 in Hong Kong